Salbari is one of the sub divisions of Baksa district in the state of Assam, India.

History
A hundred years ago, there was no village named Salbari, but the place was surrounded by various sal plantations, leading to economic and population growth.

There were some old villages like Hudukhata, Samuagati, Kamlabari and Hasora. After some years, people moved to the Salbari sub-division and villages like Salbari, Madhapur, Udhiaguri Hadan, Tangabarigaon, Aaohata, Palchiguri, Pakriguri, Uhiaguri and Gwjwnphuri were created. There was also no marketplace near Salbari, so residents went to a one-day market around 8.5 kilometres away at Bahbari Bazaar, but sometimes people of Salbari had disputes with the larger groups or local people. Therefore, the people of Salbari had the idea of creating a local marketplace and started the Salbari Bazaar.

Salbari Bazaar now has SBI, several retailer, marketplaces, local shops and police stations. The market is held every Wednesday and Saturday where all local vendors come together to sell local products.

How to reach
By Road:The Salbari Bazar is located 120 km( 3 Hours) from Guwahati Airport, 135.9 Km (3.15 Hours) from Kokrajhar through NH-27 by car or bus
By train: the nearest train station is Sorupeta(SPQ). From Sorupeta there are several sharing vehicles .Its 22km (30 Mins journey from Sorupeta)
1.GHY NBQ PASSENGER Daily (55810) arrival at 07:45 AM from Guwahati (start 05:00 AM)
2.GHY NBQ PASSENGER Daily (55818) arrival at 11:09 AM from Guwahati (start 08:10 AM)
3.SIFHUNG PASSENGER Daily (55754) arrival at 17:23 PM from Guwahati (start 14:20 PM )
4.MANAS RHINO PASSENGER Daily (55802)  arrival at 20:19 PM from Guwahati (start 17:30 PM )

National protected area
Manas National Park (Part) A popular river Beki (Mothonguri) situated near salbari (about 10 km approximately).
Major part of the world-famous Manas National Park is located in this Sub-division. The park is well known for its Wild Water Buffaloes and Golden Langurs. Mothonguri, a famous picnic spot with picturesque beauties is located in Salbari Baksa. Narenguri is another scenic location situated close to Bhutan border.

The Salbari bazaar is located at centre access point for both gate of Manas National Park. The Main gate is 12Km (30 Mins ) and 2nd gate Bhuyanpara is approx 5~6km (15 Min.)

Bhuyanpara Range is 2nd vital entry point to Manas N Park, with recent development with NGO projects there upcoming lodging facilities will be available soon within this Range of Park. From this entry you can reach one tourist spot locally named " Daimary" and from there you can visit "Mothunguri", another tourist spot. This entry is equally exciting as you have a Terai (floodplain) grasslands, which gives good far distance visibility to spot animals and birds.
Aaranyak is a leading wildlife NGO based in Guwahati has set up a venture in this Bhuyapara Range for future projects and other livelihood and conservation activity projects.

Educational institutions
 Salbari Higher Secondary School
 Salbari College, ( Degree College)
 Salbari Jr. College
 Salbari Girls Middle English & High school
Sanjarang Bodo School,Salbari
 Greenland English School (Private)
 Hathorkhi Foraisali
 Good Shepherd National School

Banks
State Bank of India , Salbari

Fino Payments Bank

References

Villages in Baksa district

  3.-national-park-complete-detail